Vendovi Island is an island in the San Juan Islands of Washington State. Located in Skagit County, Washington, United States, Vendovi Island lies across Samish Bay from mainland Skagit County, between Guemes Island and Lummi Island. The Island was named after a Fijian High Chief Ro Veidovi who was brought to North America by the Wilkes Expedition.

The San Juan Preservation Trust, a land trust that conserves open space in the San Juan Islands, purchased the island in December 2010 from the family of John Fluke Sr.

References
Vendovi Island: Block 1000, Census Tract 9501, Skagit County, Washington United States Census Bureau

Islands of Skagit County, Washington
Islands of Washington (state)
Protected areas of Skagit County, Washington
San Juan Islands